Resomiidae is a family of cnidarians belonging to the order Siphonophorae.

Genera:
 Resomia Pugh, 2006

References

 
Physonectae
Monogeneric cnidarian families